Sauveterre-de-Guyenne (literally Sauveterre of Guyenne; Gascon: Sauvatèrra de Guiana) is a commune in the Gironde department in Nouvelle-Aquitaine in southwestern France.

Toponymy
Before 1896, Sauveterre-de-Guyenne was better known as Sauveterre-de Bazadais. This Bastide was built in a small village called "Athala" and was first named Salva-Terra (Salvation of the land), which later became Saubeterre and then Sauveterre.

History
Sauveterre-de-Guyenne was founded as an English Bastide in 1281 by King Edward I of England, in the name of ending rivalries among the lords. He signed the "Charte des Coutumes de la Cité" in 1283, which protected the inhabitants and set the rules of life in the village community.

Structure
Sauveterre-de-Guyenne is a very well maintained Bastide, having the typical Bastide 'grid' layout. The entry points into the city were through four stone tower gates. The central market square is surrounded by stone houses and the typical arcades on the ground floor, full of shops. The Church of Notre Dame is located at the top of the square.

Population

The strong population increase between 1962 and 1968 is caused by the merger of Sauveterre-de-Guyenne with the former communes Le Puch, Saint-Léger-de-Vignague and Saint-Romain-de-Vignague in May 1965.

Twin towns - sister cities

See also
Communes of the Gironde department

References

References

Communes of Gironde